Down South is a short film distributed by RKO Radio Pictures, and is the ninth of the twelve Toby the Pup cartoons. The title comes from a 1901 song which is featured in the cartoon.

Plot
Toby is the pilot of a paddle steamer. One day he docks his boat at a harbor to pick up passengers. As he has to shake hands with just about everyone who comes aboard, Toby struggles to keep a smile on his face.

When the boat finally leaves the harbor, the passengers are treated to some entertainment as Tessie sings the song "Mississippi Mud" at the center of the main deck. Everybody else sings along too, and stomps as well. But as they stomp harder and harder, the boat starts to shake. The shake is so strong that almost everybody, including Toby, gets thrown overboard.

The boat isn't completely vacant as Tessie is still on board. Not liking to be alone there, she yells for help. Toby, trailing behind, swims to reach her. The boat then approaches a waterfall but Toby is able to reach it and gets back on board in time. He then moves the paddle wheels from the sides to the front. As the boat reaches the edge of the waterfall, the paddle wheels at the front work like airplane propellers, enabling it to fly. Relieved of her troubles, Tessie kisses Toby.

External links
Down South at the Big Cartoon Database

1931 animated films
American black-and-white films
1931 comedy films
1931 films
Films about dogs
Seafaring films
American animated short films
1930s English-language films
1930s American films
American comedy short films